Fengzhengia is an extinct genus of arthropod known from a single species, Fengzhengia mamingae from the Cambrian aged Chengjiang Biota of Yunnan, China. It is thought to be a basal arthropod, as one of the most basal members of Deuteropoda. Like other basal deuteropods such as Kylinxia, Fengzhengia has an upward curling pair of "frontal appendages", contrasting with the downward curving pair of frontal appendages possessed by radiodonts. The head has a pair of stalked eyes. The trunk had 15 tergites the first nine of which had upward facing spines, with the trunk terminating with a tail fan. The trunk seemingly had pairs of biramous limbs, with paddle-shaped exopods. It is thought to have been nektobenthic (swimming just above the sediment), and either a scavenger or a predator.

References 

Cambrian arthropods
Fossils of China
Fossil taxa described in 2022
Prehistoric arthropod genera